Força Lleida Club Esportiu, also known as ICG Força Lleida for sponsorship reasons, is a professional basketball team based in Lleida, Catalonia, Spain and plays in the Barris Nord, in LEB Oro league.

History
The club born in the summer of 2012 with the aim to substitute existent CE Lleida Bàsquet, which had several economic problems.

In its first season, Força Lleida qualified for the playoffs, after finalizing 7th in Regular Season, but was eliminated in the quarterfinals against Palencia. The next season, the team got the same number of victories than the past year (11), but this time just could get the 10th position. 

In 2015 the club achieved its best performance after reaching to the semifinals of the playoffs, but just one season later, Força Lleida finished in the last position becoming relegated to LEB Plata. But a few months later, the club achieved a vacant berth in the same league, so they could avoid the descent and play in LEB Oro the next season. 

In 2017, despite the team could finish the competition with more victories than lost games, they just could get the tenth position at the table, thus not qualifying for the postseason. 

Now, Força Lleida is playing in the same league with the goal of qualifying for the playoffs after the regular season.

Season by season

Players

Current roster

Depth chart

Trophies and awards

Trophies
Lliga Catalana LEB: (2)
2012, 2022

Notable players

Playing at Liga ACB

Playing on top divisions

References

External links
Federación Española de Baloncesto
Official Força Lleida website

Catalan basketball teams
LEB Oro teams
Sport in Lleida
Basketball teams established in 2012